Aster tongolensis is a plant species of the genus Aster. Along with Aster souliei, it has been used in traditional Tibetan medicine for thousands of years as treatment for bronchitis, difficulty in urinating, and hemoptysis caused by tuberculosis.

References 

tongolensis
Plants described in 1896